Mindy Jacobsen (b. Miami, Florida) is the first blind woman to be ordained as a hazzan (also called a cantor) in the history of Judaism; she was ordained in 1978 by Hebrew Union College. She has been blind since birth as a result of retinopathy of prematurity, and was one of the first group of blind children to attend public school in Miami; she was also the first blind member of her local SING OUT cast (a branch of Up with People), and later founded a cast in Tallahassee, Florida. She is the First Vice President of the National Federation of the Blind of New York.

References 
 

Hazzans
Women hazzans
Living people
People from Miami
American Jews
Year of birth missing (living people)
American blind people